Sustainable furniture design and sustainable interior design is the design of a habitable interior using furniture, finishes, and equipment while addressing the environmental impact of products and building materials used. By considering the life-cycle impact of each step, from raw material through the manufacturing process and through the product's end of life, sustainable choices can be made. Design considerations can include using recycled materials in the manufacturing process, reutilizing found furniture and using products that can be disassembled and recycled after their useful life. Another method of approach is working with local materials and vendors as a source for raw materials or products. Sustainable furniture design strives to create a closed-loop cycle in which materials and products are perpetually recycled so as to avoid disposal in landfills.

Principles 
The principles of sustainable interior design will allow designers to reduce negative effects on the environment and build for a more sustainable future. These principles include the following:
 Energy efficiency
 Low environmental impact
 Reduce waste
 Use of healthy materials
 Create healthy indoor environments

Certifications 
 CLIMATE NEUTRAL Certified
 Cradle to Cradle
 FSC (Forest Stewardship Council)
 FTC (Fair Trade Certified)
 GREENGUARD
 GRS (Global Recycling Standard)
 Global Organic Latex Standard
 Global Organic Textiles Standard
 GreenScreen
 ISO14001
 ISO9001
 Indoor Advantage
 LEVEL by BIFMA
 MADESAFE
 OEKO-TEX

References

Further reading
 McDonough, W. & Braungart M. (2002). Cradle to Cradle: Rethinking the way we make things. New York, NY: North Point Press

External links 
  MBDC Cradle to Cradle Products
  EPEA GmbH
 Quattot develops modern types of furniture

Furniture-making
Industrial design
Furniture